"Can't Keep a Good Man Down" is a song by American rock singer Eddie Money, from his album Life for the Taking in 1978. It was released as a single and reached #63 on the Billboard Hot 100.

Eddie Money songs
1979 singles
Song recordings produced by Bruce Botnick
1978 songs
Songs written by Eddie Money
Columbia Records singles